Sllatinë e Epërme is a village in Viti municipality, Kosovo.

Notes

References 

Villages in Viti, Kosovo